Jean Olié (24 March 1904 - 2003) was a Général of the French Army and the 1st Inspector of the Autonomous Group of the Foreign Legion serving primarily in the Foreign Legion from 1924 to 1961.

Military career 
Jean entered the École spéciale militaire in 1924, and was a commissioned a Sous-lieutenant in 1926 (Rif promotion).

Jean was assigned to the 28th Chasseur Battalion à Pied on 2 October 1926.

Promoted to the rank of Lieutenant on 1 October 1928, Jean served in the 4th Foreign Regiment 4e R.E. on 10 July 1931 and with the Goums where he acquired a great deal of cultural knowledge and was an expert connaisseur around Muslim affairs.

Placed hors cadre, on 20 October 1933, at the title of special services of North Africa. He was placed at the disposition resident commissioner general in Morocco.

He was promoted to Captain on 25 December 1935.

Assigned on 7 December 1936, to the directorate of political affairs at Rabat. 
He joined the 46th Infantry Regiment on 1 September 1939.

On 1 November 1940, he was assigned to the mobilization of the general staff headquarters of the 41st Division.

On 25 December 1941, he was promoted to the rank of Chef de battaillon (Commandant - Major).

In armistice leave on 9 April 1942, he was recruited at the corps of the indigenous affairs controllers of Morocco. Reintegrated in the armistice army on 16 August 1942, he was placed hors cadres at the general staff headquarters of the 15th Military Division.

Detached on 1 December 1942 to the 1e RCA, he then was designated as the general secretariat of the region of Rabat, on 24 March 1943.

On 25 September 1943, he was nominated as a Lieutenant-colonel.

Detached again, on 23 January 1944, to the 1e RCA.

He was assigned to the general staff headquarters of the 3rd Army Corps of 7 February 1944, then at the general staff headquarters of Army B, on 14 September 1944, as chief of the 3rd bureau of the 1st French Army.

In 1944, he took command of the Marching Regiment of the Foreign Legion RMLE towards the end of the war, succeeding regimental commander Lieutenant-colonel Louis-Antoine Gaultier.

He was chief of the cabinet of general commandant of the 1st French Army, from 24 November 1944, then chief of the general staff headquarters of the 3rd Armored Division, on 18 January 1945.

He was promoted to the rank of Colonel on 25 January 1945.

He entered to general cabinet, Inspector General of the Army, on 10 May 1946. 
Commandment of the territories of Agadir-Confins, on 31 May 1947, then, general secretariat of the region of Rabat, on 31 December 1947 and director of indigenous affairs course, on 30 August 1950.

He assumed command of the Autonomous Group of the Foreign Legion in 1950, and was succeeded by his second in command, général Paul Gardy.

Admitted to the 1st section of officer generals on 1 January 1953.

Military cabinet of the general, commissioner general resident of France in Morocco, on 31 August 1954.
He was designated as the Commandant the École spéciale militaire and École militaire interarmes of Saint-Cyr from 1954 to 1956.

He was then nominated as the civilian and military governor of grand Kabylie on 28 August 1956.

He was promoted to Général de division on 1 March 1957.

On 9 August 1958, Jean Olié was put at the disposition of general director of the institute of high studies of national defense and center of high military studies .

Elevated to the rank and designation of Général de corps d'armée on 1 January 1959.

He assumed command of the army corps of Constantine on 30 March 1960.

Elevated to the rank and designation of Général d'armée on 8 September 1960.

In 1961, he served simultaneously as Chief of the Military Staff of the President of the Republic of France, as well as the Secretariat-General for National Defence and Security.

Jean Olié ended his service as of 1 November 1961. He was admitted by anticipation in the 2nd section of officer generals.

On 30 April 1975, he was the ceremonial chief of the Legion's commemoration of Camarón.

Recognitions and Honors

  Grand Croix de la Légion d'honneur 
  Croix de guerre 1939-1945 (4 palms)
  Croix de guerre des théâtres d'opérations extérieures (3 palms)
  Croix de la Valeur militaire (3 palms)
 Médaille du sauvetage
  Chevalier de l'ordre du Mérite agricole
  Médaille des évadés
  Distinguished Service Order (U.K)
  Bronze Star Medal (U.S.) 
 Honorary Battlefield Badge (U.S.)
 Mérite Militaire Chérifien

He totalized 14 citations and is a Caporal-Chef d'Honneur (Honorary Senior Corporal) of the French Foreign Legion.

See also 
Major (France)
French Foreign Legion Music Band (MLE)
Moroccan Division
Saharan Méharistes Companies (méharistes sahariennes)
Jacques Lefort
Pierre Darmuzai
René Lennuyeux

References

Sources 
 Képi blanc History and Patrimony Division of the French Foreign Legion

1904 births
2003 deaths
Officers of the French Foreign Legion
French generals
French military personnel of World War II